Xiaomi Redmi Note 6 Pro is a smartphone developed by Xiaomi Inc. The phone comes in three variants, the base model comes with 3GB RAM and 32GB of internal storage. The top-end model of the device packs 6GB RAM and 64GB of internal storage, which is expandable via a microSD card up to 256GB. The phone is a mid-range derivative of the flagship Xiaomi Mi 8, sharing similar design elements including its notch display and dual-camera placement, both of which resemble that of iPhone X.

Specifications 
The Redmi Note 6 Pro comes with a 6.26-inch Full HD+ IPS LCD display with an aspect ratio of 19:9. The phone is powered by a 1.8 GHz (Max.)octa-core Snapdragon 636 processor paired with Adreno 509 GPU. The device is available in four colours including red, blue, black, and rose gold. It has 4000 mAh battery and supports Qualcomm's Quick Charge 3.0. The Xiaomi Redmi Note 6 Pro has a P2i Nano coating as a liquid repellent.

The construction of the device itself was enhanced with four cameras in total - two on the front and two on the back. This is the first time a Redmi device is being constructed using 6000 series aluminium. This is also the first Redmi Note phone with four cameras.

See also
 Redmi
 Redmi Note 5
 Redmi Note 4
 Redmi Note Prime
Redmi Note 9 Pro Max

References

External links 

Phablets
Redmi smartphones
Mobile phones introduced in 2018
Android (operating system) devices
Mobile phones with multiple rear cameras
Mobile phones with infrared transmitter
Discontinued smartphones